Fay Alicia Jones (born 18 January 1985) is a British politician who has served as the Member of Parliament (MP) for Brecon and Radnorshire since 2019. She is a member of the Conservative Party. She has been serving as Assistant Government Whip since October 2022.

Early life and education 
Fay Jones was born in Cardiff in 1985. Her father is Gwilym Jones, who at the time of her birth was the Conservative MP for Cardiff North. She studied French at King's College London.

After graduating from university, Jones' first job was as a researcher for the Prince of Wales. In 2012, she moved to the Department for Environment, Food and Rural Affairs to join the UK negotiating team in the 2011 Common Agricultural Policy reform. She then worked for the National Farmers' Union and for the public relations firm Grayling. Before the 2019 general election she was chair of Public Affairs Cymru, a membership organisation for professionals working in public affairs.

Political career 
In politics, Jones worked for the Conservative Member of the European Parliament Jonathan Evans and the Conservative MP David Jones. In 2019 she was a volunteer in Boris Johnson's campaign for leadership of the Conservative Party. She was third on the party-list in Wales for the Conservatives at the 2019 European Parliament election.

Jones was elected as MP for Brecon and Radnorshire in the 2019 general election, beating the Liberal Democrat incumbent Jane Dodds, who had been the leader of the Welsh Liberal Democrats since 2017. Dodds had won the seat in a by-election in August 2019, which had been triggered by a recall petition after the Conservative MP Chris Davies was convicted for submitting a false expenses claim.

Jones has served as Parliamentary Private Secretary (PPS) to the Department for Environment, Food and Rural Affairs. She established the All-Party Parliamentary Group for Farming. In February 2022, she was made PPS to Mark Spencer, the leader of the House of Commons. She resigned in July 2022 during the July 2022 United Kingdom government crisis.

Jones endorsed Rishi Sunak during the July–September 2022 Conservative Party leadership election.

Jones served as the Parliamentary Private Secretary (PPS) to Thérèse Coffey, the Deputy Prime Minister between September and October 2022 before being appointed as an Assistant Government Whip by Rishi Sunak.

Personal life 
Jones lives near Crickhowell, Powys. Her partner Tim serves in the British Army.

References

External links

 

 

1985 births
Living people
Alumni of King's College London
Conservative Party (UK) MPs for Welsh constituencies
UK MPs 2019–present
Politicians from Cardiff
21st-century British women politicians
21st-century Welsh women
Female members of the Parliament of the United Kingdom for Welsh constituencies
Welsh Conservative Party politicians